Coração de Jesus (English: Heart of Jesus) is a former civil parish (freguesia) in the municipality of Lisbon, Portugal. It was created on February 11, 1770. At the administrative reorganization of Lisbon on 8 December 2012 it became part of the parish Santo António.

References 

Former parishes of Lisbon